The Harriman-Jewell Series (2006–present) (originally known as the "William Jewell College Fine Arts Program" (1965–2000) and later the "Harriman Arts Program"(2000–06)), is a performing arts presentation organization founded in 1965, and based in Kansas City, Missouri.

Originally known as the "William Jewell College Fine Arts Program", it hosted Luciano Pavarotti's international recital debut on February 1, 1973. Held in William Jewell College’s John Gano Memorial Chapel, Pavarotti was perspiring due to nerves and a lingering cold. The tenor clutched a handkerchief throughout the debut, which became a signature part of his solo performances. Over the years, Pavarotti sang five recitals for the organization.

The Series has since hosted several leading tenors, including Giuseppe Filianoti (2012), Francisco Araiza (1982), Ben Heppner (1997), Marcelo Álvarez (2001), Juan Diego Flórez (2002), Daniil Shtoda (2002), Salvatore Licitra (2005), and Clifton Forbis (2006).

New York City Ballet’s Patricia McBride and Edward Villella danced in the Series’ first performance in December 1965, and violinist Itzhak Perlman played a recital in 1971.

The organization hosts a variety of free discovery concerts, and events that allow interaction with musicians and dancers.

On January 6, 2023 the organization celebrated its 1000th performance with soprano Pretty Yende and awarded the Richard Harriman Award to artists appearing ten or more times on the Series. The awardees were Alvin Ailey American Dance Theater, Emanuel Ax, Canadian Brass, Joyce DiDonato, Marilyn Horne, Warren Jones, Martin Katz (pianist), The King's Singers, Yo-Yo Ma, Wynton Marsalis, David Parsons and Parsons Dance, and Itzhak Perlman.

The organization also makes the performing arts an integral part of the college curriculum for William Jewell College students. Among the oldest colleges west of the Mississippi River, William Jewell was named TIME Magazine's "Liberal Arts College of the Year" for 2001-2002.

“Cezanne called the Louvre ‘the book in which we learn to read,’” said Terry Teachout, a Jewell alumnus and drama critic for The Wall Street Journal. “The Harriman program was the book in which I learned to see, hear, and love the performing arts. It gave me a golden yardstick of taste–-one I still use to this day.”

“No one will ever be able to calculate how the presence of some of the world’s most superb artists before area innocents influenced the development of resident music, dance and theater companies,” the Kansas City Star wrote of the Harriman-Jewell Series. “What Harriman has done...has multiplied in countless, wonderful ways.”

American Debut Recitals
Luciano Pavarotti, tenor - February 1, 1973
Ileana Cotrubaș, soprano - November 10, 1977
Yevgeny Nesterenko, bass - February 10, 1979
Francisco Araiza, tenor - November 3, 1982
Luciana Serra, soprano - October 15, 1983
Carol Vaness, soprano - November 8, 1986
Thomas Allen (baritone), baritone - November 4, 1989
June Anderson, soprano - January 19, 1991
Sergei Leiferkus, baritone - September 28, 1991
Maxim Vengerov, violin - March 8, 1993
Vladimir Chernov, baritone - September 29, 1995
Ben Heppner, tenor - October 22, 1997
Marcelo Álvarez, tenor - January 6, 2001
Juan Diego Florez, tenor - April 21, 2002
Daniil Shtoda, tenor - October 31, 2002
Sergey Khachatryan, violin - September 20, 2003
Salvatore Licitra, tenor - January 8, 2005
Clifton Forbis, tenor - May 26, 2006
Danielle de Niese, soprano - February 4, 2009
Stephen Costello, tenor - March 5, 2011
Giuseppe Filianoti, tenor - April 21, 2012
Michael Fabiano, tenor - January 19, 2013
Tara Erraught, mezzo-soprano - April 12, 2013

References

External links
 Official web site

Organizations established in 1965
Culture of Kansas City, Missouri
Performing arts in Missouri